Luke Jensen  (born June 18, 1966) is an American former professional tennis player and Grand Slam doubles champion. Jensen won the 1993 French Open Doubles title with his younger brother Murphy Jensen.

He attended the University of Southern California from 1986–87 and earned singles All-American honors both years (doubles in 1987). He began working for ESPN as a tennis analyst in 1994. Jensen compiled a 106-57 record in seven and a half seasons as the head coach of the Syracuse Women’s tennis team. Jensen worked with his brother as the touring pro, tennis director and tennis pro emeritus at the Sea Island Resort until 2016.

Tennis career
Jensen attended East Grand Rapids High School, winning the Michigan state singles championship in 1983, and graduating in 1985.

Juniors
As a junior Jensen reached the No. 1 junior world ranking in both singles and doubles in 1984.

Pro tour
Jensen turned professional in 1987. Jensen gained the nickname of "Dual Hand Luke" because he was an ambidextrous player able to serve at 130 mph with either hand.  He now does on-court analysis for ESPN for their tennis coverage. He also travels the world as an instructor, motivational speaker, and ambassador for the game.

He reached his career-high doubles ranking of world No. 6 in November 1993. In that year, he won the men's doubles title at the French Open playing with his younger brother, Murphy Jensen. Jensen's career-high singles ranking was world No. 168, achieved in July 1988.

Career doubles finals

10 titles

14 runner-ups

References

External links
 
 
 Luke Jensen ESPN Bio

1966 births
Living people
American male tennis players
French Open champions
French Open junior champions
Grand Slam (tennis) champions in men's doubles
Syracuse Orange women's tennis coaches
Tennis commentators
Tennis people from Georgia (U.S. state)
Tennis people from Michigan
Tennis players at the 1987 Pan American Games
USC Trojans men's tennis players
Tennis players from Atlanta
People from Grayling, Michigan
People from Mason County, Michigan
Pan American Games gold medalists for the United States
Pan American Games bronze medalists for the United States
Pan American Games medalists in tennis
Grand Slam (tennis) champions in boys' doubles
Competitors at the 1986 Goodwill Games
Medalists at the 1987 Pan American Games
American tennis coaches